The Sunshine Coast railway line refers to the section of Queensland's North Coast line that has regular interurban passenger services, which connect Brisbane with the Sunshine Coast and as far north as Gympie. It is the longest line on the Queensland Rail City network.

Overview

Nambour and Gympie North services use the Caboolture line to Caboolture, then the North Coast line to Nambour and Gympie North. The line consists of four tracks from Roma Street to Northgate, then three tracks to Petrie, allowing Nambour & Gympie North express services to pass the local Caboolture services. The line is then double track to Beerburrum.

North of Beerburrum, the line is single track with passing loops at most stations. Due to the rapidly rising population on the Sunshine Coast and in hinterland towns, the annual compounded growth rate for morning peak passenger numbers on the line north of Caboolture is 6%, second only to the 7.1% figure for the Gold Coast line south of Beenleigh.

Traveltrain services; the Spirit of Queensland, Spirit of the Outback and the Bundaberg and Rockhamption Tilt Trains traverse the line, along with Aurizon and Pacific National freight trains.

Upgrades
In 2001, the Queensland Government started a study for the need to upgrade the North Coast Line between Caboolture and Landsborough. 

On 14 April 2009, a new  double-track alignment from Caboolture to Beerburrum opened. A four kilometre section of the old line immediately north of Caboolture was retained for use as a passing loop, with the remainder of the old line lifted. This saw new stations at Elimbah and Beerburrum built. Glasshouse Mountains, Beerwah and Landsborough stations have all received major work including platform extensions and lifts. The line is scheduled to be duplicated to Landsborough by 2021.

In 2009, the platforms at Mooloolah, Palmwoods, Woombye, Eudlo, Eumundi, Pomona and Cooran were extended with scaffolding and plywood materials. Initially intended as an interim arrangement until permanent extensions were built, the temporary platforms remain.

A study has been completed into duplicating and straightening the line between Landsbrough and Nambour. It is proposed that two new tunnels and four upgraded stations (Mooloolah, Eudlo, Palmwoods and Woombye) will be constructed.

Line guide and services
Trains to and from Nambour typically run express between Petrie and Bowen Hills, with stops at Northgate and Eagle Junction. Trains to and from Gympie North skips stations between Caboolture and Bowen Hills stopping only at Petrie and Northgate.

To relieve congestion on the section north of Beerburrum, the rail service is supplemented by a bus service operated by Kangaroo Bus Lines on weekdays between Caboolture and Nambour as route 649.
Passengers for/from the Redcliffe Peninsula line change at Petrie, Shorncliffe line at Northgate, Airport and Doomben lines change at Eagle Junction and Ferny Grove lines change at Bowen Hills, and all other lines at Central.

References

Brisbane railway lines
Gympie
Public transport in Sunshine Coast, Queensland
3 ft 6 in gauge railways in Australia